Subhash Suri (born July 7, 1960) is an Indian-American computer scientist, a professor at the University of California, Santa Barbara. He is known for his research in computational geometry, computer networks, and algorithmic game theory.

Biography
Suri did his undergraduate studies at the Indian Institute of Technology Roorkee, graduating in 1981. He then worked as a programmer in India before beginning his graduate studies in 1984 at Johns Hopkins University, where he earned a Ph.D. in computer science in 1987 under the supervision of Joseph O'Rourke. He was a member of the technical staff at Bellcore until 1994, when he returned to academia as an associate professor at Washington University in St. Louis. He moved to a full professorship at UCSB in 2000.

He was program committee chair for the 7th Annual International Symposium on Algorithms and Computation in 1996, and program committee co-chair for the 18th ACM Symposium on Computational Geometry in 2002.

Selected publications

.
.
.
.

Awards and honors
Suri was elected as a fellow of the IEEE in 2009, of the Association for Computing Machinery in 2010, and of the American Association for the Advancement of Science in 2011.

References

External links
Home page at UCSB

1960 births
Living people
American computer scientists
Indian computer scientists
20th-century Indian mathematicians
Researchers in geometric algorithms
Johns Hopkins University alumni
Washington University in St. Louis faculty
University of California, Santa Barbara faculty
Fellows of the American Association for the Advancement of Science
Fellows of the Association for Computing Machinery
Fellow Members of the IEEE